(Las) Tres Marias ("The Three Marys") could mean:

The Brazilian municipality of Três Marias, in Minas Gerais
Las Tres Marías (group), Ecuadorian musical trio
Mexico's Islas Marías
Panama's Las Tres Marías (Panama)
Las Tres Marías is--  in Argentina, Brazil, Chile, Peru, Uruguay,  and the Philippines-- the common name for the three stars in the "Belt of Orion" in the "Orion" constellation.